Will Dissly (born July 8, 1996) is an American football tight end for the Seattle Seahawks of the National Football League (NFL). He played college football at Washington. Dissly was Montana's Gatorade High School Player of the Year in 2013.

High school
Born and raised in Bozeman, Montana, Dissly graduated from Bozeman High School in 2014. During his senior year, the Bozeman Hawks football team won the state championship. He played on both sides of the ball, recording 57 tackles and 11 receiving touchdowns while being named Montana's Gatorade High School Player of the Year. He originally committed to Boise State in  but then followed head coach Chris Petersen to Seattle to play at Washington.

College career
Dissly first committed to Boise State out of Bozeman High school in Bozeman, Montana [2014]. He was projected to be a defensive end for the Broncos. After his freshman season at Boise State [2014]; Dissly transitioned with one of his coaches to the Washington Huskies his sophomore season in 2015. After his sophomore season at Washington in 2015, he transitioned from defensive end to tight end. His first reception, against Sacramento State, went for a 27-yard touchdown. After garnering only four receptions as a junior, Dissly had 21 catches as a senior in 2017. Most reports projected Dissly as a blocking tight end.

Professional career

2018
Dissly was selected by the Seattle Seahawks in the fourth round (120th overall) of the 2018 NFL Draft. He quickly became a trusted target of quarterback Russell Wilson. In the season-opening 27–24 loss to the Denver Broncos, Dissly had three receptions for 105 yards and his first professional touchdown in his NFL debut. He followed that up with three receptions for 42 yards and another touchdown in the Monday Night Football loss to the Chicago Bears in Week 2. During Week 4 against the Cardinals in Arizona, Dissly was carted off the field with 7:52 left in the first quarter after a tackle by Cardinals' safety Antoine Bethea. Although the catch resulted in a 5-yard gain, Dissly's rookie season was cut short after suffering a patellar tendon injury, the same injury that had affected Jimmy Graham in 2015.

2019
In Week 2 against the Pittsburgh Steelers, Dissly caught 5 passes for 50 yards and 2 touchdowns as the Seahawks won 28–26.
In Week 3 against the New Orleans Saints, Dissly caught 6 passes for 62 yards and a touchdown as time expired in the 33–27 loss. In a Week 6 game against the Cleveland Browns, left the game with an Achilles injury. He was later diagnosed with a torn Achilles and was placed on season-ending injured reserve on October 19, 2019.

2022
On March 14, 2022, Dissly signed a three-year $24 million contract extension with the Seahawks. In Week 8, Dissly had a forced fumble and a fumble recovery on special teams in a 27-13 win over the New York Giants, earning NFC Special Teams Player of the Week. He finished the season with a career-high 34 catches for 349 yards and three touchdowns through 15 starts.

References

External links
Seattle Seahawks bio
Washington Huskies bio

1996 births
Living people
American football tight ends
Players of American football from Montana
Seattle Seahawks players
Sportspeople from Bozeman, Montana
Washington Huskies football players
Ed Block Courage Award recipients